Events from the year 1561 in France

Incumbents
 Monarch – Charles IX

Events
 15 May – The coronation of Charles IX
 9 September to 9 October – The Colloquy of Poissy, a religious conference which object was to effect a reconciliation between Catholics and Protestants, took place in Poissy.

Births

 8 April – Dominicus Baudius, poet, scholar and historian (d. 1613)

Full date missing
 Charles de Lorraine de Vaudémont, Roman Catholic cardinal (d. 1587)

Deaths

 13 February – Francis I, Duke of Nevers, commander in the French Royal Army (b. 1516)
 15 July – Louise de Bourbon, Duchess of Montpensier, (b. 1482)
 28 August – Jacqueline de Longwy, noblewoman, Countess of Bar-sur-Seine, Duchess of Montpensier (b. 1497).

Full date missing
 Barthélémy Aneau, poet and humanist (b. ca 1510)
 Claude Garamond, type designer, publisher and punch-cutter (b. ca 1510)
 Claude de Longwy de Givry, bishop and Cardinal (b. 1481)
 Bernard Salomon, painter, draftsman and engraver (b. 1506)

See also

References

1560s in France